John Donovan may refer to:
 John Donovan (Australian politician) (1902–1976), member of the New South Wales Legislative Assembly
 John Donovan (American football) (born 1974), American football coach
 John Donovan (writer) (1928–1992), American writer of young adult literature
 John Anthony Donovan (1911–1991), Canadian-born prelate
 John A. K. Donovan (1907–1993), Virginia lawyer, state senator, dog breeder and author
 J. J. Donovan (1858–1937), Washington state businessman and politician
 John J. Donovan (born 1942), retired American professor
 John J. Donovan Jr. (1913–1955), New York state senator
 John Donovan (Irish politician)  (1878–1922), Irish nationalist politician
 Johnny Donovan, American radio announcer

Characters
 John Donovan, character in Air Devils
 Johnny Montgomery aka John Dustin Donovan, a character in As the World Turns
 24: Legacy#Starring

See also
 Jack Donovan (disambiguation)
 John O'Donovan (disambiguation)